A plaster cast is a copy made in plaster of another 3-dimensional form. The original from which the cast is taken may be a sculpture, building, a face, a pregnant belly, a fossil or other remains such as fresh or fossilised footprints – particularly in palaeontology (a track of dinosaur footprints made in this way can be seen outside the Oxford University Museum of Natural History).

Sometimes a blank block of plaster itself was carved to produce mock-ups or first drafts of sculptures (usually relief sculptures) that would ultimately be sculpted in stone, by measuring exactly from the cast, for example by using a pointing machine. These are still described as plaster casts.  Examples of these by John Flaxman may be found in the central rotunda of the library at University College London, and elsewhere in the University's collections. It may also describe a finished original sculpture made out of plaster, though these are rarer.

Method

Plaster is applied to the original to create a mould or cast (that is, a negative impression) of the original. This mould is then removed and fresh plaster is poured into it, creating a copy in plaster of the original. Usually very elaborate moulds were made out of several to even dozens of pieces, to cast the more difficult undercut sculptures. Plaster is not flexible, therefore the moulds were made as 3D jigsaw puzzles for easy removal of the original and the cast from the mould. Later gelatine, rubber and silicone moulds were used, backed by plaster or polyester for support.

History

Early
The practice of reproducing famous sculptures in plaster originally dates back to the sixteenth century when Leone Leoni assembled a collection of casts in Milan. He collected "as many of the most celebrated works… carved and cast, antique and modern as he was able to obtain anywhere". Such private collections, however, remained modest and uncommon until the 18th century.

Classical sculpture
Use of such casts was particularly prevalent among classicists of the 18th and 19th centuries, and by 1800 there were extensive collections in Berlin, Paris, Vienna and elsewhere. By creating copies of ancient Greek and Roman sculptures held at various museums across Europe in this way, a reference collection of all the best and most representative sculptural types could be formed, at a fraction of the cost of purchasing original sculptures, which scholars could consult without necessarily having to travel abroad to see all the originals.  These casts could also be used in experiments in polychromy (reconstructing paint layers found on sculptures), reconstruction (e.g. Adolf Furtwängler's reconstruction of the Lemnian Athena from pieces found in different places), and for filling holes in a museum's collections of actual sculpture (e.g. the British Museum sent casts of some of its Mesopotamian collection to the Louvre in return for a cast of the Louvre's Code of Hammurabi).
Formula  plaster of Paris- idiota

Other ancient cultures

The technique was also applied later that century to reliefs from Ancient Egypt and friezes from Mesopotamia (examples of both of which may be seen on the North-East Staircase and in Room 52 of the British Museum), as well as to medieval and Renaissance sculptures (as may be seen in the Cast Courts at the Victoria and Albert Museum, which were a product of growing interest in medieval art at that time and the resulting desire to have a 'reference collection' of such art). In the early 19th century, for example, perhaps as an expression of national pride, casts were made of outstanding national monuments particularly in France and Germany.

Cast collections
As well as those locations mentioned above, classical cast collections may be seen at the Museum of Classical Archaeology at the University of Cambridge, at the Ashmolean Museum in Oxford, in the Royal Cast Collection in Copenhagen, and the Bellarmine Museum of Art at Fairfield University. The British Museum also holds classical casts, but these are currently all in storage.

External links
Plaster cast collections database of over 175 locations worldwide
Conference on the use of plaster casts
Cast Collection, Copenhagen
University of Cambridge: Museum of Classical Archaeology
History of the Oxford cast collection
Fairfield University Plaster Cast Collection
V&A Museum: Caring for Plaster

Sculpture materials
Sculpture techniques